Coke Studio Philippines is a music television program in the Philippines featuring performances by various Filipino music artists. It is inspired by the Pakistani show of the same name.

History
Created by The Coca-Cola Company, the show has earlier editions in other countries in Asia like Pakistan and India. The first season of the Coke Studio Philippines was aired on TV5 and was produced by Eraserheads band members, Raimund Marasigan & Buddy Zabala. The second season was named Coke Studio Homecoming, it was aired on ABS-CBN and was produced by Saab Magalona, the daughter of Filipino hip-hop icon Francis Magalona and the co-leading vocalist of indie band Cheats. For the 3rd season, it was hosted by former Pinoy Big Brother alumnus and singer/actress Ylona Garcia.

Seasons overview
Below is a list of artists who debuted in Coke Studio Philippines, and have performed at least once since its inception in 2017.

Season 1 (2017)
Coke Studio PH Season 1 line up.

 Noel Cabangon x Curtismith
 Gabby Alipe and John Dinopol of Urbandub x The Ransom Collective
 Ebe Dancel x Autotelic
 Moonstar88 x Jensen and The Flips
 Sandwich x BP Valenzuela
 Abra x Gracenote
 Franco x Reese Lansangan

Season 2 (2018)
Coke Studio Homecoming line up.

 IV of Spades x Shanti Dope
 Quest x Juan Miguel Severo
 Kriesha Chu x DJ Patty Tiu
 Sam Concepcion x Ben&Ben
 Moira Dela Torre x AJ Rafael
 Khalil Ramos x December Avenue
 apl.de.ap x KZ Tandingan

Season 3 (2019)
Coke Studio PH Season 3 line up.

 Iñigo Pascual x Ron Henley
 Brisom x Silent Sanctuary
 Morissette x St. Wolf
 Clara Benin x Janine Teñoso x Bea Lorenzo
 Just Hush x UDD
 Lola Amour x Al James
 This Band x Sarah Geronimo

Season 4 (2020)
Coke Studio PH season 4 line up.

 Unique
 December Avenue
 Moira Dela Torre 
 Shanti Dope
 KZ Tandingan
 Sarah Geronimo

Season 5 (2021)
Coke Studio PH Breakada Artists line up.

 BGYO x Keiko Necesario
 Janine Teñoso x Mc Einstein
 ALLMO$T x Rob Deniel
 Iñigo Pascual x Alamat
 Angela Ken x CLR
 Bandang Lapis x Syd Hartha
 Skusta Clee x Magnus Haven
 Moira Dela Torre x The Juans

References

External links
 

Rock music television series
Pop music television series
Philippine music television series
Philippines
TV5 (Philippine TV network) original programming
ABS-CBN original programming
2017 Philippine television series debuts
2019 Philippine television series endings